A list of Political Parties in Assam

Major National Parties
 Bharatiya Janata Party (BJP)
 Indian National Congress (INC)

Major Regional Parties
 Asom Gana Parishad (AGP)
 All India United Democratic Front (AIUDF)
 Bodoland People's Front (BPF)
 United People's Party Liberal (UPPL)
 Raijor Dal (RD)

Minor National-Level Parties
 Communist Party of India (Marxist)
 Communist Party of India
 All India Trinamool Congress (AITC)
 Nationalist Congress Party (NCP)

Minor Regional Parties
 Assam Jatiya Parishad (AJP)
 Anchalik Gana Morcha (AGM)
 CPI(ML) Liberation
Asom Bharatiya Janata Party (ABJP)
 Liberal Democratic Party (LDP)
 Ganashakti Party (GP)
 Gana Suraksha Party
 Barak Democratic Front (BDF)
 United Tribal Nationalist Liberation Front (UTNLF)
 Plain Tribals Council of Assam (PTCA)
 Rabha Jatiya Aikya Manch (RJAM)
 Tiwa Jatiya Aikya Manch (TJAM)
 Marxist Manch (MM)

Defunct Regional Parties
 Indian Congress (Socialist) – Sarat Chandra Sinha
 All People's Party (APP)
 Asom Gana Parishad (Pragatishel) (AGP-P)
 Natun Asom Gana Parishad (NAGP)
 Trinamool Gana Parishad (TGP)
 Asom Jatiya Sanmilan (AJS)
 United Minorities Front (UMF) {merged with All India United Democratic Front (AIUDF)}
 United People's Party of Assam (UPPA)
 Krishak Banuva Panchayat (KBP)
 Bodo People's Progressive Front (BPPF)
 Autonomous State Demand Committee (ASDC)
 Autonomous State Demand Committee (United) (ASDC-U)
 Autonomous State Demand Committee (Progressive) (ASDC-P)
 Plain Tribals Council of Assam (Progressive) (PTCA-P)
 Purbanchaliya Loka Parishad (PLP)
 Gana Mukti Sangram Asom (GMSA) {merged wth Raijor Dal}

References 

Political parties in Assam